Kendall is a town on the Mid North Coast of New South Wales, Australia.

History 
The Birpai (also known as Birrbay) people have lived in this area for more than 40,000 years.

Kendall was originally named Camden Heads, as it is located on the Camden Haven River. It was renamed Kendall, in 1891, after the Australian poet Henry Kendall, and not, as some tourists suspect, after the similarly spelled ancient town of Kendal in the County of Cumbria in England. Henry Kendall lived in the area from 1875 to 1881 when he was the first Forest Inspector for New South Wales.

Kendall is located 3 kilometres from Kew and 36 kilometres southwest of Port Macquarie via the Pacific Highway. It is one of the seven villages that make up the Camden Haven region of the Port Macquarie/Hastings Local Government Area.

 Middle Brother State Forest, located on the slopes of Middle Brother Mountain which was named by Captain James Cook
 Poet's Walk

Heritage listings
Kendall has a number of heritage-listed sites, including:
 Comboyne Street: Kendall School of Arts

Population
In the 2016 Census, there were 1,141 people in Kendall. 84.0% of people were born in Australia and 89.3% of people spoke only English at home. The most common responses for religion were No Religion 29.9%, Anglican 27.0% and Catholic 16.9%.

Transport
Kendall railway station is served by three XPT services daily from Sydney on the North Coast railway line.

Notable People

William Tyrell – Missing child that sparked a nationwide manhunt.

See also 
 Disappearance of William Tyrrell

References

External links

Kendall Village Community Home Page Accessed: 2007-09-12

 
Mid North Coast
Towns in New South Wales
Port Macquarie-Hastings Council